Malcolm Archer  (born 1952) is an English composer, conductor and organist. He combines this work with a recital career.  Archer was formerly Organist and Director of Music at Bristol Cathedral, Wells Cathedral and at St Paul's Cathedral and Director of Chapel Music at Winchester College. He married Alison (an artist and musician) in 1994, and they have a son (b.1997) and a daughter. (b.1999)

Education and early career
Malcolm Archer was educated at King Edward VII School, Lytham before studying at the Royal College of Music (as an RCO scholar).  He was later organ scholar at Jesus College, Cambridge.  His organ teachers include Ralph Downes, Gillian Weir, and Nicolas Kynaston and he studied composition with Herbert Sumsion Bernard Stevens and Alan Ridout.

Later career

First posts 
Malcolm Archer's first posts were at Norwich Cathedral as Assistant Organist (1978–1983), and Bristol Cathedral (1983–1990) leaving to spend time living and working in the US.

Wells Cathedral (1996–2004)
Archer was appointed Organist and Master of the Choristers at Wells Cathedral in 1996 where he directed and trained the Cathedral choir for its daily services in the cathedral, as well as being the musical director for Wells Cathedral Oratorio Society. In April 2000 he and choir members participated in a tour to North America, which included concerts in Ottawa, Ontario; Albany, New York; Richmond, Virginia; Lancaster, Pennsylvania; Washington, DC; Lancaster, Ohio; Chicago, Illinois; St. Paul, Minnesota; Chattanooga, Tennessee and Augusta, Georgia. He has made several recordings with the choir to critical acclaim, recording with the labels Hyperion and Lammas.

St Paul's Cathedral (2004–2007)
Malcolm Archer took over as organist and Director of Music at St Paul's from John Scott in 2004. He directed the choir for several important state services, including the service to celebrate the 80th birthday of HM the Queen, for which he composed a special anthem.

Winchester College (2007–2018)
In August 2007 he took up a position as Director of Chapel Music and Organist at Winchester College, where he was in charge of the Winchester College Chapel Choir and the College Quiristers as well as teaching composition and the organ. Important recordings with the choir include Stanford's choral music, Britten's A Ceremony of Carols, Three Wings (Warner Classics) and Mozart's Requiem, accompanied by the London Mozart Players. Malcolm Archer moved from Winchester College in 2018 to pursue his career as a choral and orchestral conductor and composer. Asked in a recent interview about his College choir, he commented that: “They are equally as good as any of the choirs I’ve worked with, and one of the great privileges for me is to be able to work with talented young musicians and see them achieve fantastic standards of choral singing. Most of our older boys in the choir, our altos, tenors and basses, are in the sixth form and a good number of them will go on to choral scholarships at Oxford and Cambridge, in choirs such as King’s College Cambridge, St John’s College Cambridge and the fine Oxford choirs’’.

Prohibition Order (2022)

At a hearing of the Teaching Regulation Agency (TRA) in July 2022, Archer was judged by the panel to have engaged in sexual activity with a pupil, while employed as assistant director of music at Magdalen College School, Oxford, between 1977 and 1978. The TRA heard evidence from the pupil detailing the sexual abuse, which Archer had been separately acquitted from at a trial at Chelmsford Crown Court. Subsequently, he received a prohibition order banning him from teaching in England, without the ability to apply for the order to be revoked.

Compositions
'Malcolm Archer's talent for writing for voices is legendary. His are marvellously singable melodies with a fine sense of rhythm and an organ part which really helps the singers.' He has 'a fine ear for choral sonority, an admirable sensitivity to words, and a genuine and distinctive melodic voice. His harmonic language is accessible and traditional (in the best sense of the word) but it is never bland. Above all, I think, his music conveys a genuine atmosphere and uplifts the listener.'

Archer's major works include ‘Requiem’, ‘Vespers’, ‘Three Psalms of David’, ‘The Coming of the Kingdom’, the musical, ‘Walter and the Pigeons’, the one-act opera, ‘George and the Dragon’, ‘Sinfonietta’ for orchestra, ‘Concerto for Trumpet and Strings’ and ‘Sonata for Cello and Piano’.

He has over 250 published compositions, and he is published by Oxford University Press and RSCM Publications amongst other companies. His choral works are performed by church, college and cathedral choirs throughout the world, and include:

 A Hymn to the Virgin
 A Hymn to St Cecilia
 Alleluia, Who Is This Who Comes in Triumph?
 A New Commandment
 At the Round Earth's Imagined Corners
 Ave Verum Corpus
 Before the End of the Day
 Bless the Lord
 Blessed Are the Pure in Heart
 Bread of Heaven On thee We Feed
 Brightest and Best
 Christ Be Beside Me
 Christ Is Our Cornerstone
 Christ Who Knows
 Christ Whose Glory Fills the Skies
 Come My Way
 Creator of the Stars of Night
 Dance My Heart
 Exsultet
 Give Us the Wings
 God Be in My Head
 God Who Made the Earth
 Holy Is the True Light
 How Like an Angel
 Hymn to the Holy Spirit
 Jesu My Truth My Way
 Jubilate Deo
 Judge Eternal
 Lead Kindly Light
 Let All the World
 Light's Abode Celestial Salem
 Little Lamb Who Made thee
 Lord of All
 Lord of All Hopefulness
 Love Bade Me Welcome
 Love Is Not Feeling
 Love's Redeeming Work Is Done
 Missa Omnes Sancti
 O Breath of God
 O Clap Your Hands
 O Praise God in His Holiness
 O Sacrum Convivium
 O Salutaris
 Pie Jesu
 Praise to the Lord the Almighty
 Rejoice the Lord Is King
 Set Me as a Seal
 Sing Praise and Thanksgiving
 Sweet Music Sweeter Far
 Tantum Ergo
 The Lord's My Shepherd
 There Is No Rose
 Thou God of Truth
 When I Survey
 Who Is This Who Comes?
 Ye Choirs of New Jerusalem

The Berkshire Service 
The Clifton Service
The Wells Service
The Chichester Service 
The St. Martin's Service
The St. Mark's Service 
Missa Montis Regalis
Missa Omnes Sancti
Missa Brevis (a Capella)
Benedicite
Jubilate
The Pembroke Te Deum (written for Pembroke College, Cambridge)

References

External links
Website of Malcolm Archer
Printed Notes by OUP

1952 births
Living people
Cathedral organists
English classical organists
British male organists
Alumni of Jesus College, Cambridge
Alumni of the Royal College of Music
People educated at King Edward VII and Queen Mary School
21st-century organists
21st-century British male musicians
Male classical organists